Hey There, It's Yogi Bear! is a 1964 American animated musical comedy film produced by Hanna-Barbera Productions and released by Columbia Pictures. The film stars the voices of Daws Butler, Don Messick, Julie Bennett, Mel Blanc, and J. Pat O'Malley.

Based upon Hanna-Barbera's syndicated animated television show The Yogi Bear Show, Hey There, It's Yogi Bear! was the first theatrical feature produced by Hanna-Barbera, and the first feature-length theatrical animated film based on a television program. In keeping with the limited animation of the television series, the film was not fully animated, but did contain more detailed animation work than the show.

Plot
Boo-Boo Bear wakes up from winter hibernation, excited about the new Spring. Then Yogi Bear wakes up, his only interest finding some food to eat. Cindy Bear unsuccessfully tries to woo Yogi. After Ranger Smith thwarts Yogi's latest attempts to grab some food, Yogi gets angry and convinces the Ranger to transfer him out of Jellystone National Park. Smith prepares Yogi to be sent over to the San Diego Zoo along with an identification tag. Yogi first says goodbye to everything, but tricks another bear named Corn Pone into going to California instead of him and Boo-Boo and Cindy remain unaware of this, thinking Yogi has departed for good.

Soon, Yogi is stealing food from all over the park under the alter ego "The Brown Phantom", but Smith believes "The Brown Phantom" is a Yogi impostor who scares all of the Jellystone goers and gobbles their food up shortly after stealing it. He threatens whoever it is to be sent to the zoo and comes up with a clever plan to stop "The Brown Phantom". Cindy, wishing to be with Yogi at the zoo, angers Smith into mistakenly sending her away. However, she gets sent to the St. Louis Zoo by train instead, as the San Diego Zoo does not need any more bears. When she realizes her true destination, she gets very sad, crying since she knows she would be far from Yogi now. Late that night, Cindy falls out of the train and becomes lost. A traveling circus, run by the Chizzling Brothers, is looking for a great act to raise their ratings, when suddenly, their dog Mugger runs off and scares Cindy into walking on the telephone wires, the perfect act to save their circus.

Yogi has recently missed Boo-Boo and, above all, Cindy. Ranger Smith tricks "The Brown Phantom" in going to the St. Louis Zoo as part of his plan to save Jellystone. Soon, Yogi and Boo-Boo escape from Jellystone to find Cindy. Meanwhile, Ranger Smith decides to let them find their way home to avoid trouble with the Park Commissioner, who thinks Yogi, Boo-Boo, and Cindy are "The Brown Phantom" and his two henchmen, and they send the police to hunt down "The Brown Phantom", which is the second part of his plan. After an extensive travel, Yogi and Boo-Boo locate Cindy, who is being kept a prisoner, forced to perform her high-wire act for the Chizzling Brother's circus. As Yogi confronts the manager, Grifter Chizzing, he is tricked into joining Cindy in her cage, where Grifter tells him he's now in "show biz." Boo-Boo releases Yogi and Cindy and they make their exit. As they make their way home, they crash a barnyard party, somehow escaping afloat a river with the barn's door. Then, while Cindy & Yogi dream about a honeymoon in Venice, they find themselves suddenly being chased and hunted by the police, as they somehow became fugitives, but make their escape.

They hitch a ride in a moving van, but find themselves in the middle of a busy city (later revealed to be New York City) and make a run from the police to the top of a hotel and across to a high rise under construction. The next morning, Ranger Smith sees the three bears on television and decides to arrest "The Brown Phantom" in a helicopter as the final part of his plan to save Jellystone. With the name of "The Brown Phantom" cleared up (which is Yogi), all the commotions have made great publicity for Jellystone and Ranger Smith reveals to the bears that he simply didn't understand and was just trying to rescue them, gets promoted to Chief Ranger by the Park Commissioner, bringing all three bears back to Jellystone, where they promise to be "good bears" from now on.

Cast
 Daws Butler as Yogi Bear (aka "The Brown Phantom"), Airplane Pilot, Ranger Tom
 James Darren as Yogi Bear (singing "Ven-e, Ven-o, Ven-a")
 Bill Lee as Yogi Bear (singing "Ash Can Parade", "Whistle Your Way Back Home" and "Yogi Loves Cindy")
 Don Messick as Boo-Boo Bear, Ranger Smith, Ranger Jones, Mugger, Yogi's conscience, the blonde-haired policemen, TV Reporter, Airport Manager
 Ernest Newton as Boo-Boo Bear (singing)
 Julie Bennett as Cindy Bear
 Jackie Ward as Cindy Bear (singing)
 Mel Blanc as Grifter Chizzling, Southern Accented Bear in Train, Mugger The Dog (grumbling sounds)
 Jean Vander Pyl as the Barn Dance Woman
 Hal Smith as Corn Pone, Moose
 J. Pat O'Malley as Snively Chizzling

Uncredited
 Allan Melvin as the Police Sergeant
 Jonah and the Wailers as the singing voices of the zoo-bound bears performing "St. Louis"
 Thurl Ravenscroft as the black-haired policemen

Production
The animated musical film was produced and directed by William Hanna and Joseph Barbera, with a story by Hanna, Barbera, and former Warner Bros. Cartoons storyman Warren Foster. Another Warner Cartoons alumnus, Friz Freleng, served as story supervisor. When the Warner Bros. Cartoons studio closed in 1963, several of its animators, including Gerry Chiniquy and Ken Harris, also joined Hanna-Barbera to work on this film.

Release and reception
A review from the May 27, 1964 issue of Variety pointed out that the scarcity of theatrically released feature animated films made Hey There, It's Yogi Bear! highly marketable. The review called the film "artistically accomplished in all departments". The review commented that the script was a bit redundant, but that the songs were "pleasant, if not especially distinguished".

After its 1964 release, the film was reissued on January 17, 1986, as part of Atlantic Releasing Corporation's short-lived Clubhouse Pictures label.

Home media
The film was released on VHS a few times in the United States by Paramount Home Video, KVC Home Video, and GoodTimes Home Video respectively in the 1980s and 1993. These releases use the 1986 Clubhouse Pictures reissue version, but it is not known if it contains the Columbia references.  In 2000, Warner Home Video included this film on its VHS Bumper Collections (with several other TV shows) in Australia. This release also lacks the original Columbia Pictures card and credit references. A later release in the United States was branded after the Boomerang television network in promotion of its debut.

On December 2, 2008, Warner Home Video released the film on DVD in North America. However, like a concurrent DVD release of another Hanna-Barbera feature, The Man Called Flintstone, this release alters the opening of the film by removing the Columbia Pictures logo and its credit references. Unlike the former, it is presented in 1.78:1 anamorphic widescreen (both films were animated in 1.33:1 and matted to 1.85:1 for theaters). A R2 DVD was released in the UK on January 31, 2011 and is also presented in 1.78:1.

References

Notes

External links

 
 
 
 
 

1964 films
1964 animated films
1964 musical comedy films
1960s American animated films
1960s children's animated films
1960s English-language films
American adventure comedy films
American musical comedy films
American children's animated adventure films
American children's animated comedy films
American children's animated musical films
American road movies
Animated films about bears
Animated films about trains
Animated films set in New York City
Animated films based on animated series
Circus films
Columbia Pictures animated films
Columbia Pictures films
Films directed by Joseph Barbera
Films directed by William Hanna
Films scored by Marty Paich
Hanna-Barbera animated films
Yogi Bear films